Radhostice is a municipality and village in Prachatice District in the South Bohemian Region of the Czech Republic. It has about 200 inhabitants.

Administrative parts
Villages of Dvorec, Libotyně and Lštění are administrative parts of Radhostice.

References

Villages in Prachatice District